Magnus Fredriksson (born 28 January 1960) is a Swedish wrestler. He competed at the 1988 Summer Olympics and the 1992 Summer Olympics.

References

External links
 

1960 births
Living people
Swedish male sport wrestlers
Olympic wrestlers of Sweden
Wrestlers at the 1988 Summer Olympics
Wrestlers at the 1992 Summer Olympics
People from Falköping Municipality
Sportspeople from Västra Götaland County
20th-century Swedish people